William Payne Durham (born June 15, 2000) is an American football tight ends for the Purdue Boilermakers.

High school career
Durham attended Peachtree Ridge High School in Suwanee, Georgia. He played lacrosse in high school and did not start playing football until his senior year. In his lone season, he had 22 receptions for 330 yards and five touchdowns. He committed to Purdue University to play college football.

College career
Durham played in two games his first year at Purdue in 2018. In 2019, he started four of 12 games and had nine receptions for 82 yards and four touchdowns. He started all six games in 2020, recording 16 receptions for 166 yards and three touchdowns. Durham started 10 of 12 games in 2021, finishing with 467 yards on 45 receptions and six touchdowns. He returned to Purdue as the starter in 2022.

References

External links
Purdue Boilermakers bio

2000 births
Living people
Players of American football from Georgia (U.S. state)
American football tight ends
Purdue Boilermakers football players